The Hong Kong Christian Council (Also known as HKCC) is a Protestant Christian ecumenical organization founded in Hong Kong in 1954. It is a member of the World Council of Churches and the Christian Conference of Asia. The current general secretary is Rev Dr Lo Lung-kwong, the previous Director of the Divinity School of Chung Chi College, Chinese University of Hong Kong, effective from 1 July 2018.

Although not all Protestant churches in Hong Kong are members of the Christian Council, the HKCC assists to select the election committee of the Chief Executive of Hong Kong in the Protestant sector.

Notable leaders include Rev. Kwok Nai-wang, a senior pastor of the Hong Kong Council of the Church of Christ in China.

Member churches 

 Chinese Christian Literature Council
 Christian Action Hong Kong (Part of Christian Aid)
 Evangelical Lutheran Church of Hong Kong
 Finnish Evangelical Lutheran Mission
 German-speaking Evangelical Lutheran Congregation in Hong Kong
 Hong Kong Bible Society
 Hong Kong Council of the Church of Christ in China
 Hong Kong Japanese Christian Fellowship
 Hong Kong Sheng Kung Hui
Hong Kong Young Women's Christian Association (HKYMCA)
Kowloon Union Church
Lutheran Theological Seminary, Hong Kong
The Methodist Church, Hong Kong
Orthodox Metropolitanate of Hong Kong and South East Asia
 The Salvation Army Hong Kong and Macau Command
 Tao Fong Shan
 Tsung Tsin Mission of Hong Kong
Union Church Hong Kong
 YMCA of Hong Kong

See also 
 Christianity in Hong Kong

References

External links 
 
World Council of Churches listing
 Hong Kong Christian Council Annual Reports

Members of the World Council of Churches
National councils of churches
Christian organizations based in Asia
Religious organisations based in Hong Kong
Christian organizations established in 1954
1954 establishments in Hong Kong
Protestantism in Hong Kong